The Washington County Courthouse located at 214 C St. in Washington, Kansas is an Art Deco-style courthouse built during c.1932-1934.  It was listed on the National Register of Historic Places in 2000.

It replaced a previous courthouse which was damaged in a tornado on July 4, 1932.  The new courthouse was designed by Wichita architects Overend and Boucher.

It is a two-story building built of Bedford limestone.  It has two-story square towers projecting from each corner.

References

External links

Government buildings on the National Register of Historic Places in Kansas
Art Deco architecture in Kansas
Government buildings completed in 1932
Washington County, Kansas
Courthouses in Kansas